Spyridium spadiceum is a species of flowering plant in the family Rhamnaceae and is endemic to the south of Western Australia. It is an erect or semi-prostrate shrub with narrowly oblong to oval leaves and heads of hairy flowers with brown bracts at the base.

Description
The flowers heads are arranged in cymes with many broad, brown bracts at the base.

Taxonomy
This species was first formally described in 1837 by Eduard Fenzl who gave it the name Trymalium spadiceum in Enumeratio plantarum quas in Novae Hollandiae ora austro-occidentali ad fluvium Cygnorum et in sinu Regis Georgii collegit Carolus Liber Baro de Hügel. In 1863, George Bentham changed the name to Spyridium spadiceum in Flora Australiensis. The specific epithet (spadiceum) means "brown" or "date-coloured", referring to the floral bracts.

Distribution and habitat
Spyridium spadiceum grows on granitic hills in the Porongurup Range and at Albany in the Jarrah Forest bioregion in the south of Western Australia.

Conservation status
Spyridium spadiceum is listed as "Priority Four" by the Government of Western Australia Department of Biodiversity, Conservation and Attractions, meaning that it is rare or near threatened.

References

spadiceum
Rosales of Australia
Flora of Western Australia
Plants described in 1837
Taxa named by Eduard Fenzl